Carry You is a song by Union J from their 2013 album Union J.

Carry You may also refer to:

"Carry You" (Missy Higgins song), a song performed by Missy Higgins written by Tim Minchin
"Carry You", a song by the Fire Theft from their 2003 self-titled album